The Malone Pioneers program was a college football team that represented Malone University.  The team had 7 head coaches since its first recorded football game in 1993 until the program was discontinued after the 2018 season. The final head coach was Fred Thomas who took the position beginning with the 2015 season after serving as the assistant coach for the program in 2014.  The university announced in February 2019 that it had voted to cancel the program after 26 seasons as a cost-cutting measure.

Key

Coaches

Details
The following are details on coaches that do not have articles on Wikipedia.  For coaches with articles on Wikipedia, see links in the table above.

Dan Hanson

Coaching history

Assistant coaching positions
Hanson first served as defensive coordinator at Olivet Nazarene University in Kankakee, Illinois.  He later moved to Canton, Ohio to be the defensive coordinator at Malone College.

Malone University
Hanson was promoted to become the fourth head coach for Malone.  He held that position for four seasons, from 2002 until 2005, when he resigned for personal reasons.  His career coaching record at Malone was 13 wins, 27 losses, and 0 ties.  This ranks him third at Malone in total wins and fourth at Malone in winning percentage.  His conference record in the Mid-States Football Association was 5 wins and 21 losses during his tenure.

Hanson's inaugural 2002 season started out with three consecutive wins and a national ranking  but was answered with 3 consecutive losses.  The team would win one more before finishing 2002 with a 4-6 record.  Despite the losing record, Malone outscored their opponents 245 to 196.

Head Coaching record

Playing History
Before taking an assistant coach position at Olivet Nazarene University, Hanson played football for the school as an undergraduate while working on his bachelor's degree.

Personal life
After leaving coaching, Hanson took a position as the Administrative Pastor at Canton First Church of the Nazarene, where he now serves as lead pastor.  Hanson earned his Bachelor of Arts in Religion from Olivet Nazarene University and also holds two master's degrees in religion and teaching.  Hanson has also continued to be involved in the sport of American football through camps and youth involvement.

Notes

References

Lists of college football head coaches

Ohio sports-related lists